The Astarita Stakes was an American Thoroughbred horse race run between 1946 and 2005 at New York's Aqueduct Racetrack in South Ozone Park, Queens and at Belmont Park in Elmont. Open to two-year-old fillies, it was a sprint race contested on dirt over a distance of six and a half furlongs. It offered a purse of $100,000.

The Astarita was given Grade III stakes status in 1973 when a grading system was instituted at all racetracks in North America. In 1981 it was elevated to a Grade II event before being downgraded in 2004 to its original Grade III which was maintained until the race was dropped from the schedule in 2006.

In 1955 the Greater New York Association took over management of Belmont Park, Aqueduct Racetrack, Jamaica Race Course and the Saratoga Race Course. Massive renovations led to the subsequent closure of Aqueduct Racetrack for four years and there was no Astarita Stakes run for the three years between 1958 and 1960.

The race was named for Astarita, John Follansbee's filly who won the 1902 inaugural running of the Astoria Stakes at the now defunct Gravesend Race Track on Coney Island, New York City.  The Astarita Stakes was run at:
 Aqueduct Racetrack: 1946–1955, 1962–1966, 1993–1994, 1997
 Belmont Park: 1956–1957, 1961

It was contested at various distances:
 6 furlongs : 1946–1956
 6.5 furlongs : 1972–1994, 1997–2005
 7 furlongs : 1957–1971, 1996
 8 furlongs : 1995

The Astarita was run in two divisions in 1965, 1968 and 1972.

Historical notes
The first running of the Astarita Stakes took place at Aqueduct on September 21, 1946. It was won by Keynote, a strawberry roan filly owned by the Wheatley Stable and ridden by future Canadian Horse Racing Hall of Fame inductee Hedley Woodhouse.

USN Rear-Admiral Howard Adams Flanigan won the 1954 running of the Astarita with his good filly Two Stars. On the same racecard, future U. S. Racing Hall of Fame jockey Ted Atkinson reached a milestone in his career with his 3,000th win aboard the Greentree Stable colt Devastation.

In 1955 Cosmah captured the Astarita Stakes and in 1963 her daughter Tosmah, a future U.S. Racing Hall of Fame inductee, also won it.

The 1961 edition was won by Cicada, Christopher Chenery's three-time National Champion and U.S. Racing Hall of Fame inductee.

In 1964 Queen Empress won by a nose but was disqualified to second for interference giving the win to runner-up I Deceive.

In 2000 Extra Heat's win extended her career unbeaten streak to six. She would be voted the 2001 American Champion Three-Year-Old Filly and in 2015 would be inducted into the U.S. Racing Hall of Fame.

The final running of the Astarita Stakes took place on October 2, 2005. It was won by Sensation with Eibar Coa aboard for owner Gary and Betty Biszantz's Cobra Farm and their partner, the Castletop Stable owned by Morton and Bobbi Topfer.

Records
Speed record:
 110.00 @ 6 furlongs – Alanesian (1956)
 1:16.40 @ 6.5 furlongs – Stulcer (1974)
 1:22.60 @ 7 furlongs – Syrian Sea (1967)

Most wins by a jockey:
 4 – Ron Turcotte (1965, 1968, 1970, 1973)

Most wins by a trainer:
 2 – Casey Hayes (1961, 1967)
 2 – Charles P. Sanborn (1964, 1982)
 2 – Del W. Carroll (1970, 1980)
 2 – James A. Jerkens (1997, 1999)

Most wins by an owner:
 2 – Wheatley Stable (1946, 1966)
 2 – Pin Oak Stable (1953, 1992)
 2 – Meadow Stable (1961, 1967)
 2 – Harbor View Farm (1965, 1973)

Winners

 † In 1964 Queen Empress won by a nose but was disqualified to second for interference.
 † In 1962 Smart Deb won what would have been her eighth straight win had she not been disqualified for interference. 
 † In 1955 Dark Charger won but was disqualified to last.

External links
 Belmont Park at the NYRA

References

Discontinued horse races in New York (state)
Belmont Park
Aqueduct Racetrack
Flat horse races for two-year-old fillies
Graded stakes races in the United States
1946 establishments in New York City
2005 disestablishments in New York (state)
Recurring sporting events established in 1946
Recurring sporting events disestablished in 2005